The Antioch Missionary Baptist Church Cemetery is located at 500 North McKinney Road in Sherrill, Arkansas, behind the Antioch Missionary Baptist Church.  The earliest graves contain the remains of emancipated slaves, originally enslaved on the Good Hope Plantation in South Carolina, but moved to Jefferson County, Arkansas in 1860.  Reverenced Lewis Mazique, a leader in the community, was the earliest documented burial, in 1885.  The cemetery continues to be used today, although infrequently.

The cemetery was listed on the National Register of Historic Places in 2009.

See also

 National Register of Historic Places listings in Jefferson County, Arkansas

References

External links
 
 
 

1885 establishments in Arkansas
Cemeteries in Jefferson County, Arkansas
Cemeteries on the National Register of Historic Places in Arkansas
National Register of Historic Places in Jefferson County, Arkansas
Cultural infrastructure completed in 1885
Baptist Christianity in Arkansas
Cemeteries established in the 1880s